is a Japanese-American actor. He began his career on stage on Broadway and in regional theaters, starring in musicals like Mame, Lovely Ladies, Kind Gentlemen, and Pacific Overtures. He has appeared in dozens of movies and television shows in character roles, including Midway, Gung Ho, Presumed Innocent, Teenage Mutant Ninja Turtles III, The Shadow, Jackie Chan Adventures, Samurai Jack, and Southland Tales.

Early life and education
Shimono was born and raised in Sacramento, California, to restaurant owners Edith Mary (née Otani) and Masauchi Shimono.

During World War II, following the signing of Executive Order 9066, Shimono and his family were interned at the Tule Lake War Relocation Center and the Granada War Relocation Center.

He attended Sacramento High School and graduated from University of California, Berkeley.

Career
Shimono has appeared on Broadway and in regional theaters including San Francisco's American Conservatory Theater and Berkeley Repertory Theatre. He was cast as Ito opposite Angela Lansbury's Auntie Mame in Jerry Herman's Broadway musical hit Mame in 1966. This was followed by Lovely Ladies, Kind Gentlemen (1970), The Chickencoop Chinaman (1972), and the role of Manjiro in Stephen Sondheim & Harold Prince's Pacific Overtures (1976) – he would go on to play Lord Abe in the 2004 Broadway revival. He was in the short lived 1978 musical Barbary Coast, and was nominated for a Drama Desk Award for Outstanding Actor in a Play for his leading performance in Philip Kan Gotanda's The Wash.  In 2010, he appeared in the world premiere of No-No Boy by Ken Narasaki based on the novel by John Okada. He is closely affiliated with the East West Players and South Coast Repertory companies, most recently starring in a run of Julia Cho's Aubergine.

His film roles include Saito in the 1986 comedy Gung Ho, Hiroshi Kawamura in the 1990 drama Come See the Paradise, the coroner "Painless" Kumagai in 1990's Presumed Innocent, Dr. Max Shinoda in 1993's Suture, Lord Norinaga in 1993's Teenage Mutant Ninja Turtles III, and in Old Dogs, alongside John Travolta and Robin Williams, as Japanese billionaire Yoshiro Nishamura. He played Dr. Tam in the 1994 film The Shadow. He can also be seen in Asian American independent films Americanese (2006), The Sensei (2008) and Life Tastes Good (1999). Shimono performed the voice of Subotai in the 1982 film Conan the Barbarian, dubbing actor Gerry Lopez.

On television, he starred on the 2008 ABC family miniseries Samurai Girl. Then Shimono provided the voices of antique-shop owner/Chi Wizard Uncle Chan on the television series Jackie Chan Adventures, the elderly version of the Emperor (Jack's father) on Samurai Jack, Airbending Master Monk Gyatso and Master Yu on the popular series Avatar: The Last Airbender, Mister Sparkle ("In Marge We Trust") and Master Sushi Chef ("One Fish, Two Fish, Blowfish, Blue Fish") on The Simpsons and Mr. Murakami on 2012's Teenage Mutant Ninja Turtles series. 
He also appeared in Royal Pains, season 3 episode "But There's a Catch", as Jono the gardener. In 2007, he appeared in the episode "Don't Worry, Speed Racer" on Two and a Half Men. In 1991 he had a role in the TV film/pilot Plymouth, which at the time was considered to be one of the most expensive such movies ever made. He also appeared in two episodes of the television show M*A*S*H.

Personal life
Shimono is gay and has been in a relationship with writer Steve Alden Nelson since 2001. The couple registered their domestic partnership in April 2005 and married in San Diego on June 23, 2008.

Theater credits

Filmography

Film

Television

References

External links
 
 Sab Shimono at New York Times Movies 
 

1937 births
Living people
American male film actors
American male television actors
American male voice actors
American male stage actors
Male actors from Sacramento, California
American twins
American gay actors
Japanese-American internees
American male actors of Japanese descent
American film actors of Asian descent
American LGBT people of Asian descent
LGBT people from California